Dacomitinib, sold under the brand name Vizimpro, is a medication for the treatment of non-small-cell lung carcinoma (NSCLC).  It is a selective and irreversible inhibitor of EGFR.

Dacomitinib has advanced to several Phase III clinical trials.  The January 2014 results of the first trials were disappointing, with a failure to meet the study goals.  Additional Phase III trials are ongoing.

In 2017, results of a trial comparing dacomitinib to gefitinib for NSCLC (driven by mutated EGFR) were announced.

Dacomitinib was approved for medical use in the United States in September 2018, in Japan in 2019, and in the European Union in 2019, for the treatment of non-small cell lung cancer with epidermal growth factor receptor (EGFR) gene mutation.

References

External links 
 

Anilines
Antineoplastic drugs
CYP2D6 inhibitors
1-Piperidinyl compounds
Pfizer brands
Quinazolines
Orphan drugs